"Juliet of the Spirits" is a song recorded by the B-52s. It is the second single from the band's eighth full-length studio album, Funplex. A digital single and remix were released on September 9, 2008.

The song was inspired by the film Juliet of the Spirits (Italian: Giulietta degli spiriti), a 1965 drama about an Italian housewife directed by Federico Fellini. The song's lyrics project themes of sexual liberation and awakening.

Track listing
 "Juliet Of The Spirits" (Zoned Out Mix) – 4:54
 "Juliet Of The Spirits" (Dan McKie Vocal Mix) – 8:17
 "Juliet Of The Spirits" (Glenn Morrison & Bruce Aisher Mix) – 8:01
 "Juliet Of The Spirits" (Morgan Page Mix) – 6:57

Charts

References

2008 singles
The B-52's songs
2007 songs
Adaptations of works by Federico Fellini